Edward Salomons (1828–1906) was an English architect based in Manchester, active in the late 19th century. He is known for his architecture in the Gothic Revival and Italianate styles.

His prominent commissions in Manchester include the Manchester Jewish Museum (1875), the Manchester Reform Club (1870-1871), described by Claire Hartwell, in her Manchester Pevsner City Guide, as Salomon’s “best city-centre building”, the former Manchester and Salford Trustee Savings Bank (1872), and the now-demolished Exhibition Hall, built for the city's Art Treasures Exhibition (1857). In London, he assisted with the design of the Agnew Gallery on Old Bond Street (1876) and the New West End Synagogue (1863); he was himself of Jewish origin.

References

Sources

External links 
Architects of Greater Manchester (1800-1940) Edward Salomons entry

1828 births
1906 deaths
Architects from Manchester
English Jews